The northern schiffornis (Schiffornis veraepacis), is a species of Neotropical bird.

Distribution and habitat
It is found from southeast Mexico to western Colombia and Venezuela.  Its natural habitats are subtropical or tropical moist lowland forests and subtropical or tropical moist montane forests.

Description
It is medium-sized, about 24 cm (9 in.) long.

Taxonomy
The northern schiffornis has traditionally been placed in the manakin family, but evidence strongly suggest it is better placed in Tityridae, where now placed by SACC.

The species was split by the AOU in 2013 from the species complex thrush-like schiffornis.

References

northern schiffornis
Birds of Central America
Birds of the Tumbes-Chocó-Magdalena
northern schiffornis
northern schiffornis
northern schiffornis